Barrie Dyer is a New Zealand rugby league player who represented New Zealand in the 1975 World Cup.

Playing career
Dyer played in the Auckland Rugby League competition. In 1974 he played for Auckland when they defeated Great Britain 11-2. In 1975 he was part of Auckland sides who defeated France 9-3 and lost to Australia 6-17.

He was selected for the New Zealand national rugby league team squad for the 1975 World Cup but did not play a match at the tournament.

References

Living people
New Zealand rugby league players
New Zealand national rugby league team players
Auckland rugby league team players
Rugby league second-rows
Date of birth missing (living people)
Place of birth missing (living people)
Year of birth missing (living people)